James Lisney (born 6 May 1962) is a British concert pianist. He studied with Phyllis Sellick and John Barstow – and early success was achieved after he gained representation by the Young Concert Artists Trust. He has gained particular distinction for his collaborative work with Emma Kirkby, Alexander Baillie and Paul Barritt, and has appeared as soloist with many major orchestras.

In the early 1980s he arranged the music for several of Jeff Minter's games for the Commodore 64, including Hover Bovver, Revenge of the Mutant Camels, and Sheep in Space.

Since 2000 he has pioneered two major initiatives: an innovative series of concerts at London's South Bank called Schubertreise - a concept that he has adapted to various other cyclic presentations in other European venues; and a record company called Woodhouse Editions to add to his previous discography on companies such as BIS, Olympia, Naxos, Carlton and Somm.

In 2009 he made his US debut with a short residency at Carnegie Hall and consolidated his work in the Netherlands with a solo debut at the Amsterdam Concertgebouw.

Discography
 A Schubert Recital (2000), Olympia – James Lisney, piano
 Seasons (2000), Innovative Records – James Lisney, piano
 Amy Beach: Chanson d'Amour (2002), BIS Records – Emma Kirkby; James Lisney; Paul Barritt; Charles Medlam
 The Beethoven Sonatas for Piano and Violoncello (2004), Genuin – Alexander Baillie, violoncello; James Lisney, piano
 Schubert: Sonata in B flat, Impromptus, Grazer Fantasy, Drei Klavierstücke (2008), Regent – James Lisney, piano
 Thomas Schmidt-Kowalski: Cello Sonatas (2009), Naxos – Alexander Baillie, violoncello; James Lisney, piano
 Schubertreise volume 1, Woodhouse Editions – James Lisney, piano
 Schubertreise volume 2, Woodhouse Editions – Joy Lisney, violoncello; James Lisney, piano
 Johannes Brahms, Woodhouse Editions – Paul Barritt, violin; James Lisney, piano
 Beethoven: the complete works for piano and violin, Woodhouse Editions – Paul Barritt, violin; James Lisney, piano
 Beethoven: the complete works for piano and violoncello, Woodhouse Editions – Alexander Baillie, violoncello; James Lisney, piano
 Franz Schubert, Woodhouse Editions – James Lisney, piano

References

External links
 Woodhouse editions – his record company

English classical pianists
Male classical pianists
1962 births
Living people
21st-century classical pianists
21st-century British male musicians
Place of birth missing (living people)